Ettore Majorana Foundation and Centre for Scientific Culture (acronym EMFCSC) is an scientific organization based in Erice, Sicily (Italy). The President of EMFCSC is Prof. Antonino Zichichi. It sponsors the International School of Subnuclear Physics whose Director is Prof. Antonino Zichichi.

See also
 Erice statement

External links
 Ettore Majorana Foundation and Centre for Scientific Culture 
 The History of EMFCSC
 International School of Subnuclear Physics 

Education in Sicily